De La Salle University–Dasmariñas also referred to by its acronym DLSU-D or La Salle–Dasma;  is a private Roman Catholic, Lasallian co-educational secondary and higher education institution run by the De La Salle Brothers of the Philippine District of the Christian Brothers in Dasmariñas, Philippines. It is a member of De La Salle Philippines, a network of 16 Lasallian educational institutions.

DLSU-D, despite its name, is an autonomous university separate from the De La Salle University in Manila. Both universities are members of the De La Salle Philippines System.

History
The university was established on July 18, 1977, as a private, nonsectarian tertiary school named General Emilio Aguinaldo College-Cavite and managed by the Yaman Lahi Foundation. In 1987, ownership and management were transferred to Frère (St.) Bénilde Romançon Educational Foundation Inc., a sister corporation of De La Salle University-Manila. It became a Catholic institution under the name De La Salle University-Emilio Aguinaldo College. In 1992, the name DLSU-EAC was changed to De La Salle University-Aguinaldo. In 1997, the institution's name was changed again. It is presently known as De La Salle University–Dasmariñas to avoid confusion with the Emilio Aguinaldo College Cavite campus.

Campus

East campus

The East campus is occupied by the Colleges of Liberal Arts and Communication, Science and Computer Studies, Tourism and Hospitality Management. The bookstore, different laboratories, chapel, museum, and the Aklatang Emilio Aguinaldo are also located here.
 Magdalo Gate (Gate 1) - named after the Katipunan faction led by Emilio Aguinaldo, it serves as an entry-exit point for students, faculty, staff, and visitors going to the East Campus.
 La Porteria - located near Magpuri Gate, houses the Student Welfare and Formation Office (SWAFO), and the Language Learning Center (LLC) on the second floor.
 Julian Felipe Hall (JFH) - named after the composer of the Lupang Hinirang, it is the College of Liberal Arts building. It houses classrooms, and laboratories for Communication, Broadcast Journalism, Psychology, and Speech students. It also houses the Tanghalang Julian Felipe (theater) and the Bulwagang Jose Basa, which serves as the parliamentary hall and laboratory for the Political Science students.
 Paulo Campos Hall (PCH) - named after DLSU-D's founder, it is the university's science building. Found here is the Chemical and Biological Research Laboratories, which serve as venues for scientific works and research-based activities. The laboratories allow students to study biology, Biochemistry, Organic and Analytical Chemistry, Ecology, Physics, and Natural History.
 Pantaleon Garcia Hall (PGH) - serves as the 267th Reserve Officers Training Corps headquarters
 Mariano Alvarez Hall (MAH) - named after a Caviteño hero, it formerly housed the Information and Communications Technology Center and computer laboratories until the new Information and Communications Technology Center building was erected. It was also the former building of the College of Education and now houses the Buildings, Facilities, and Maintenance Office (BFMO).
 College of Tourism and Hospitality Management (CTHM) - serves as the primary building of Hotel & Restaurant Management and Tourism students. It houses various laboratories and function rooms. This building replaced the two buildings, which are the Emiliano Riego de Dios Hall (ERH) and Olivia Salamanca Hall (OSH).
 College of Science (COS) - has ten classrooms and houses the faculty rooms of Biological Sciences, Physical Sciences, Computer Studies, and Mathematics departments, and Graduate Studies
 Information and Communications Technology Center (ICTC) - serves as the new computer laboratory of the university after its completion.
 Small Business Center (SBC) - a canteen on the first floor was replaced by National Bookstore while the Lasallian Community Development Center (an organization established for community service) is based on the second floor.
 Severino Delas Alas Hall (SDH/Alumni Building) - a function building that also serves as the office of the De La Salle Alumni Association (DLSU-D Chapter). Houses two conference rooms, a multi-purpose function hall, and a 450-seater auditorium.
 Botanical Garden - serves as a research center for Biology students, as well as recreation for the DLSU-D community.

Cultural Heritage Complex
As part of DLSU-D's aim for cultural development, and maintaining its Spanish-period-inspired motif, the three structures in the Museum Complex were officially named the Cultural Heritage Complex.
 Aklatang Emilio Aguinaldo (AEA) - DLSU-D's library. It houses collections of books, periodicals, theses, and other reference materials. It was modeled after Emilio Aguinaldo's residential house at Kawit, Cavite. The first building was a scaled-down model, and featured only the facade. The new building is an exact model of the Aguinaldo shrine with the tower. It houses most of the collections and archives, and has discussion rooms, as well as the Executive Vice President's office (which will remain until the new Administration building is finished). The old building houses the Electronic Resource Services (the Internet nook), the Educational Media Services (which holds such media as videos, slides, presentations, and the like), as well as four viewing and conference rooms.
 Museo De La Salle 
Museo De La Salle is a museum dedicated to the preservation of certain aspects and material culture of the 19th-century Philippine ilustrado lifestyle. The Museo was built to contribute to cross-disciplinary learning and growth in the academic environment, and to provide a fine example of  Philippine culture that is linked to its immediate community while being open to the outside world.

Its collection comprises antique family heirlooms such as furniture, decorative objects, fine and applied arts displayed in faithfully recreated rooms, donated by, or on long-term loan from collectors. Among the donors and lenders are Jose Ma. Ricardo A. Panlilio of the Santos-Joven Panlilio family of Bacolor, Pampanga; Brother Andrew Gonzalez, FSC, of the Arnedo-Gonzales family of Sulipan Apalit, Pampanga; Marie Theresa Lammoglia-Virata, Victorina Vizcarra Amaliñgan, the D.M. Guevara Foundation Inc., Paulino and Hetty Que, former National Commission for Culture and the Arts Chairman Jaime C. Laya and international jeweler Fe Sarmiento - Panlilio. The construction and design of the Museo, which was a collaboration between project leader Jose Ma. Panlilio and the architectural team of OBMapua and Partners led by architects Joel Lopez and Obi Mapua Jr. took years to finish in its aim to faithfully represent the lifestyle of the period.
 Antonio and Victoria Cojuangco Memorial Chapel of Our Lady of the Holy Rosary - modeled after the facade of the parish church of Maragondon, Cavite, it was dedicated to the martyrs who were killed during World War II when they took refuge at the DLSU-Manila campus during Liberation. Houses the Campus Ministry Office.

West campus
Situated in the West campus, 600 meters away from the East campus, are the Colleges of Business Administration and Accountancy, Engineering, Architecture and Technology, the condominiums, dormitories, canteens, and the administration building.
 University Food Square - an al fresco food court, where most of the members of the DLSU-D community gather to eat.
 Lake Park - an open-air activity center, where most student events take place.
 Ladislao Diwa Hall (LDH) - named after a hero of Biyak-na-Bato, this building holds the classrooms of the College of Education.
 Felipe Calderon Hall (FCH) - It is currently used by the College of Education and the College of Criminal Justice Education.
 Vito Belarmino Hall (VBH) - a former classroom building. It currently serves as the warehouses for both the staff and the student organizations.
 Gregoria Montoya Hall (GMH) - named after a heroine during the Revolution, this is more known as the Administration building. It houses most administrators' offices. The Registrar's, the Accounting, the Purchasing, and Internal Audit offices are based here. In addition, most student organizations hold office in this building, namely: the University Student Council, the Heraldo Filipino (official student publication), the Council of Student Organizations, and the Performing Arts Group.
 Candido Tirona Hall (CTH) - it was one of the oldest buildings in the university until the structure was renovated in 2012 to support the fast-growing population of the university and serve as a temporary building for the College of Engineering and Architecture Technology. It is the former building of the Accountancy Department of the College of Business Administration.
 College of Engineering, Architecture, and Technology (CEAT) Building - currently out of order or closed due to its structural instability. It was formerly named the College of Engineering and Technology Building (CET), was a newly built building finished in 2004 which replaced the Don Placido Campos Hall (DPH). One of the most modern buildings in DLSU-D, it used to serve as the primary building for Engineering and Architecture students until it was vacated in the second semester of 2011 due to its structural instability. Laboratories, function halls, offices, and classrooms were situated here.
 Mariano Trias Hall (MTH) - formerly the CET building, now occupied by the College of Business Administration, specifically the Business Management department. But due to the structural instability of the College of Engineering and Architecture Technology building, the College of Business Administration is currently sharing this with the College of Engineering and Architecture Technology.
 College of Business Administration - Graduate School of Business (CBA-GSB) Building - houses classrooms, laboratories, function rooms, and offices. It serves as the primary building of the College of Business Administration and Accountancy.
 Track Oval - one of DLSU-D's sports facilities. It was renovated in 2012 and was finished in January 2013.
 Grandstand - serves as seating for spectators. Also houses classrooms and the athletes' quarters.
 Ugnayang La Salle (ULS) - formerly the Palaruang La Salle (meaning "The Playplace of La Salle"), it is the sports complex. It houses a three-court stadium, the offices of the Physical Education Department and the Sports Development Office (SDO) and an Olympic-sized pool adjacent to it. This is also where most of the university events are held.
 High School Building - the infrastructure that houses the DLSU-D High School students. In 2016, in compliance to the K-12 curriculum, DLSU-D opened its doors for Senior High School students.
 Magdiwang Gate (Gate 3) - named after Mariano Álvarez's faction of the Katipunan, it serves as an auxiliary entry for both pedestrians and motorists.

Other structures
 Dormitories
 Campus Gourmet and Hotel Rafael - laboratories for Hotel and Restaurant Management students.
 National Book Store
 Atsushi Herb House
 University Events Center
 Amphitheater

Affiliations
De La Salle University-Dasmariñas is a member of De La Salle Philippines, a network of 16 Lasallian institutions established in 2006. DLSP is the successor of the De La Salle University System, a similar organization.

The university also maintains linkages with local academic institutions namely: De La Salle-Santiago Zobel School, University of Baguio, University of Batangas, Central Luzon State University, industries ( Philippine Airlines, ABS-CBN Broadcasting Corporation, Intel, Jollibee-Fast Food Career Dev't. Program) and government units Cultural Center of the Philippines, Bangko Sentral ng Pilipinas, Senate of the Philippines, National Fisheries Biological Center for collaborative training and research, technical consultancy, and faculty and student exchange.

Research
DLSU-D established the University Research Office to manage the university's research activities and programs.

The office has funded and supported numerous faculty researches in the fields of science, education, liberal arts, and technology, among others.

Articles, excerpts, and abstracts from selected researches were compiled and published in the bi-annual journal SINAG. SINAG means "ray of light" in Filipino.

The office closely works with college deans and college publication committees in preparation for the first issues of the four(4) newly conceptualized refereed journals in 2007 which focus on the disciplines of the 7 colleges: Science & Technology Journal (COS, CLEAPS & CET), Journal of Humanities (CLA), Journal of Business (CBA & CIHM), and Journal of Education (COE).

Cavite Studies Center

The Cavite Studies Center pursues the DLSU-D's vision-mission of "undertaking research focusing on Cavite history and culture." It produces research outputs on the  history of Cavite, the province, and to highlight its role in national history.

Student life
In A.Y. 2014–2015, 29,253 students were enrolled in the university's seven colleges.

Heraldo Filipino

The Heraldo Filipino (HF) is the official student newspaper of De La Salle University-Dasmariñas. It publishes news about on-campus events and issues concerning the Lasallian community.

HF can also refer to the student organization that produces publications (namely: magazines, books, booklets, etc.) and hosts events for the DLSU-D community.

Athletics
The Patriots is the official name of the DLSU-D Varsity teams. The name was adopted in 1997, a reference to the province's history during the uprising against the Spanish rule in the Philippines.

Basketball and volleyball are the school's main sports. Other varsity sports include track and field, taekwondo, judo, aikido, table tennis, badminton, chess and football.

DLSU-Dasmariñas is a longtime member of the National Capital Region Athletic Association (NCRAA) and is a charter member of the Universities and Colleges Athletic Association (UCAA) from its inception in 2002. The school is also a member of the Private Schools Athletic Association and the annual University Games (UNIGAMES) hosted mostly by provincial schools.

In October 2003, the school became the first institution from the Luzon area to host the UNIGAMES meet.

Its men's and women's volleyball teams have won several championships in the UCAA and NCRAA, as they have been at one time, the year's multiple times defending titlists. Their basketball playing style has given them marginal success that includes a runner-up finish in the UCAA against their former namesake Emilio Aguinaldo College in 2005.

Human Lasallian Star
The Lasallian "Signum Fidei" Sign of Faith Star is a 350-year-old international symbol of the Christian Brothers of the De La Salle Schools that represents their religious vocation of quality God-centered, Christian-values-based education in 1,500 Lasallian institutions with 70 Universities and Colleges that's globally established by Saint La Salle's Christian Brothers in 82 countries. The Signum Fidei Lasallian was inspired by the Nativity Christmas Star from Bethlehem that symbolized Saint La Salle's mission of Teaching Minds, Touching Hearts and Transforming Lives of the poor. The Lasallian mission was to give hope to the Last, Least, and the Lost of the most venerable youth in our society.

The Human Lasallian Star first came to life on February 11, 2009, during the Lasallian Days Festival as a means to encourage all Lasallians to show their school spirit in an environment of camaraderie and shared ideals. Attended by over 10,000 administrators, students, and faculty, the first attempt to form the largest human star in the world was held at the DLSU-D oval and was witnessed by spectators from the top of the CBA building and the DLSU-D grandstand. The star spanned approximately 71  meters, and occupied a total area of 2,145 square meters.

DLSU-D attempted the feat again on January 26, 2010, this time at night. The event drew in 13,000 participants: students, faculty, administrators, and parents. Participants were given the glow sticks of green and white, the school colors of De La Salle. As night fell, the crowd assembled into a huge star twinkling brightly against the darkness. This moment of history was further heightened by the singing of the school hymn.

La Estrella Verde
La Estrella Verde (LEV) is the official Senior High School (SHS) student publication of De La Salle University–Dasmariñas. Founded and established in 2016, the publication serves as a medium (through print, online, and radio) for students to be aware of all current events and latest updates happening around the senior high school community.
Its name translates to "The Green Star."

ANIMOSAIC 2: Humans of St. La Salle
De La Salle University-Dasmariñas (DLSU-D) had broken records with its human formation of the Lasallian Signum Fidei Star and a coin mural of the school logo. To commemorate the 300th feast day of its founder, thousands of people held color-coded umbrellas to form the largest image of Saint Jean-Baptiste de La Salle at the DLSU-D Track Oval on Sunday, April 7, 2019. About 6,000 students, employees, and stakeholders of DLSU-D participated in the fundraising event dubbed "Animosaic 2: Humans of St La Salle." The fundraising event is dedicated to all the scholars and aspiring scholars of DLSU-D. Seeking to beat the record set by China after it formed a giant human smiley with 3,099 participants in 2016, Lasallians made their own bid for the record with some 6,000 Lasallians forming the image of Saint Jean-Baptiste de La Salle, the university name as well as the #300LaSalle which signifies the 300th death anniversary of the Father Founder. The event is made more significant as it was celebrated with the Feast Day of St. La Salle. The event is also consistent with Lasallian institutions all around the world making their own human formations of the image of Saint Jean-Baptiste de La Salle as part of the Humans of St. La Salle initiative.

Notable alumni
 Marian Rivera - actress
 Arny Ross Roque - actress
 Diether Ocampo - actor
 Jodi Sta. Maria - actress
 Roxanne Guinoo - actress
 Miguel Tanfelix - actor
 Mark Herras - actor, dancer
 Sunshine Dizon - actress
 Christian Bables - actor
 Honey Lacuna- Mayor of Manila

References

External links
 De La Salle University-Dasmariñas

Dasmariñas
Universities and colleges in Cavite
Educational institutions established in 1977
Education in Dasmariñas
1977 establishments in the Philippines
Association of Christian Universities and Colleges in Asia